Monotract is a three-piece experimental music group based in Brooklyn, New York but originated in Miami, Florida. The group consists of Nancy Garcia, Carlos Giffoni and Roger Rimada. Alberto Laburu recently joined the group in 2008.

Early years
The group began as an improvisational performance group in 1998, but over the years has worked on creating music with greater complexity and more song-oriented composition. The first self-released 7", Traffican't, contained musical selections assembled from the groups very first informal improvisational session in early 1998. A subsequent 2000 CD release - entitled Blaggout - on Animal World Recordings consisted of 30 tracks and 74 minutes of assembled song ideas, sonic experimentations, fully fleshed out compositions, individual member recordings, and a mish-mash of those elements together. The original release of this was notable for the shards of broken glass that covered the cardboard CD sleeve.

A full-length LP, Pagu, was released in 2002 on Public Eyesore Records and featured the group's change of direction towards a more electronic sound. Using a mixture of hardware programming gear, distorted vocals and altered keyboard sounds the group focused on a more song-oriented approach for the first time and much of this was flexed during the band's 2002 tour of Japan and its 2003 tour of the US Midwest. Both tours featured track selections from Pagu re-created onstage with great difficulty.

New Monotract releases were planned for 2006 with a release  entitled XPRMNTL LVRS slated for June 2006 and a Load Records release entitled Trueno Oscuro for an April 2007 release. Both records are said to be more instrument-oriented, darker sounding and percussive while still maintaining their electronic leanings.

Of note is that all the Monotract members are of Hispanic origin (Giffoni is Venezuelan while Garcia and Rimada are born of Cuban parents) and it is an influence in both their lyrical and musical expressions - something of a rarity in the "noise" music community they are currently a part of.

American experimental musical groups
Ecstatic Peace! artists
Load Records artists